Sainte-Christine-d'Auvergne is a small village in the Portneuf Regional County in the province of Quebec, Canada. It is located on the south shore of the Sainte-Anne River on Route 354, between St-Casimir and St-Raymond.

It is the place where the Canadian-American actor Glenn Ford was born in 1916.

History
In 1893, the local mission was founded, named after Sainte Christine (born Clara Deschènes) who held a senior position at the Daughters of Charity in Quebec at that time. In 1895, it became a parish by separating from Saint-Raymond, Saint-Basile, and Notre-Dame-de-Portneuf. A year later, it was incorporated as the Parish Municipality of Sainte-Christine and its post office opened.

The town was also frequently called Sainte-Christine-de-l'Auvergne, Sainte-Christine-d'Auvergne, or Sainte-Christine-de-Portneuf in order to distinguish it from a namesake municipality in the Montérégie region. In 1991, the place officially changed its name to Sainte-Christine-d'Auvergne.

Demographics

Population

Population trend:
 Population in 2021: 617 (2016 to 2021 population change: 12%)
 Population in 2016: 551
 Population in 2011: 448 
 Population in 2006: 462
 Population in 2001: 330
 Population in 1996: 337
 Population in 1991: 314

Private dwellings occupied by usual residents: 225 (total dwellings: 411)

Mother tongue:
 English as first language: 1.6%
 French as first language: 96.8%
 English and French as first language: 0%
 Other as first language: 0.8%

See also 
 Portneuf Regional County Municipality
 Clair Lake (Sainte-Christine-d'Auvergne)

References

External links

Municipalities in Quebec
Incorporated places in Capitale-Nationale